Aaron Marquel Brooks is an American freestyle and folkstyle wrestler who competes at internationally at 86 kilograms and collegiately at 184 pounds. In freestyle, he is a Cadet World Champion and Junior World Championship silver medalist. As a collegiate wrestler, Brooks is a three-time NCAA champion and a three-time B1G Conference champion out of the Pennsylvania State University. As of May 25, 2022, Brooks is the top-ranked 184-pound NCAA wrestler in the country as per Intermat.

Folkstyle career

High school 
Brooks was born in Hagerstown, Maryland and attended North Hagerstown High School. As a freshman ('14-'15), he won his first MPSSAA title and also won the NHSCA Freshman National championship, both at 126 pounds. As a sophomore (15'-16'), he bumped up to 138 pounds and repeated last year's results as he became a two-time Maryland state champion and won the NHSCA Sophomore National championship. As a junior (16'-17'), he once again bulked up now to 152 pounds and became a three-time state and national champion. As a senior (17'-18'), he became just the seventh wrestler to ever win four NHSCA National championships and also the seventh wrestler to win four MPSSAA titles. He compiled an overall record of 163 wins and just two losses (45–1, 43–1, 46–0 and 22–0).

College 
In early February 2018, Brooks committed to Cael Sanderson and the Penn State Nittany Lions as the number one recruit in the country. After focusing on the freestyle during the 2018–19 season, Brooks arrived to Pennsylvania State University.

2019–20 
Brooks started the season as a redshirt athlete at 184 pounds and compiled 3 wins and no losses during a Mat-Town Open title run before getting his redshirt pulled in December and becoming the starter of the team. After getting four more convincing victories in different dual meets, Brooks was downed by Nebraska's Taylor Venz in his first and only setback of the season, as he continued to get his hand raised in five more meetings before the regular season's end. In the post-season, he competed at the Big Ten Conference championships, where he major'd the Gopher Owen Webster in the opening round and avenged his only collegiate loss to date with a fall over Venz in the next round. In the tournament's final, Brooks took out Michigan State's Cameron Caffey with a 3-2 decision to claim the Conference championship. Brooks was then scheduled to compete at the 2020 NCAA Championships, however, the event was cancelled due to the COVID-19 pandemic. After the season, he earned All-American honors due to his performance through the year and was also named the Big Ten Freshman of the Year.

2020–21 
In October 2020, the NCAA granted an extra year of eligibility to winter athletes due to the last season being cut short. Competing as a sophomore, Brooks compiled an undefeated 6–0 record during regular season. To start the post-season, Brooks claimed his second straight Big Ten Conference title, defeating Nelson Brands from Iowa, John Poznanski from Rutgers and Taylor Venz from Nebraska. On March 20, Brooks claimed the NCAA title for the Nittany Lions after going 5–0 at the tournament.

Freestyle career

Cadet & Junior 
Brooks excelled in freestyle at the cadet level, winning his first Fargo National title in 2016, as well as the Greco-Roman one. In 2017, he went on to compete at the UWW Cadet Nationals, a qualifier for the Cadet World Championships. After making the finals, Brooks was downed twice by Travis Wittlake, ending as an alternate for the World Team. However, it was then reported that Wittlake had suffered an injury and Brooks replaced him. In between, he once again won Fargo but now in the junior level, At the World Championships, Brooks outscored his opponents by a total of 57 points to 14 and claimed the World title.

In 2018, Brooks competed at the US Open (junior level) in April. He outscored his five opponents 53 points to 7 and claimed the championship. In May, he won the best-of-three for the World Team Trials. At the World Championships, he reached the finals of the tournament with victories by technical fall, points and disqualification. He lost the finale to Hayato Ishiguro in a back-and-forth 10–11 match, claiming the silver medal.

After graduating in 17'-18', Brooks spent the hole 18'-19' season at the US Olympic Training Center, sharpening his freestyle abilities. During 2019, he made his third age-group World Team, winning the US Open and then the WTT, just like last year. Despite high expectations, Brooks went out early in the opening round as he fell 3–5 to Abubakr Abakerov.

Senior

2019 
During his time at the OTC, Brooks made his senior level debut on January, at the Dave Schultz Memorial International. He completely dominated both of his matches, pinning Stacey Davis and tech'ing Nate Jackson, a class of '17 collegiate graduate and former two-time NCAA Division I All-American, 13 points to 0.

Brooks came back in December at the US Senior Nationals. After reaching the semifinals of the tournament, he was downed by two-time NCAA Division I champion and eventual winner of the championship Zahid Valencia, 0 points to 6. He then lost his match at the consolation semifinals to graduated Gopher and two-time DI All-American Brett Pfarr. In the fifth place match, he got teched by Samuel Brooks, whom he had defeated earlier in the tournament, placing sixth. He was one place away from qualifying for the US Olympic Trials.

2020 
Brooks was scheduled to come back into the freestyle scene against Brett Pfarr on October 20, at the NLWC II. However, Brooks was dropped out of the card of undisclosed reasons and replaced by Jaime Espinal.

Brooks competed at the rescheduled US Olympic Team Trials in April 2, in an attempt to represent the United States at the 2020 Summer Olympics. Brooks went 2–2 at the tournament.

Freestyle record 

! colspan="7"| Senior Freestyle Matches
|-
!  Res.
!  Record
!  Opponent
!  Score
!  Date
!  Event
!  Location
|-
! style=background:white colspan=7 |
|-
|Loss
|7–5
|align=left| Pat Downey
|style="font-size:88%"|TF 0–11
|style="font-size:88%" rowspan=4|April 2–3, 2021
|style="font-size:88%" rowspan=4|2020 US Olympic Team Trials
|style="text-align:left;font-size:88%;" rowspan=4| Fort Worth, Texas
|-
|Win
|7–4
|align=left| Sammy Brooks
|style="font-size:88%"|6–3
|-
|Loss
|6–4
|align=left| Zahid Valencia
|style="font-size:88%"|3–6
|-
|Win
|6–3
|align=left| Nate Jackson
|style="font-size:88%"|3–0
|-
! style=background:white colspan=7 |
|-
|Loss
|5–3
|align=left| Sammy Brooks
|style="font-size:88%"|TF 0-10
|style="font-size:88%" rowspan=6|December 20–22, 2019
|style="font-size:88%" rowspan=6|2019 Senior Nationals - US Olympic Trials Qualifier
|style="text-align:left;font-size:88%;" rowspan=6|
 Fort Worth, Texas
|-
|Loss
|5–2
|align=left| Brett Pfarr
|style="font-size:88%"|5-5
|-
|Loss
|5–1
|align=left| Zahid Valencia
|style="font-size:88%"|0-6
|-
|Win
|5–0
|align=left| Sammy Brooks
|style="font-size:88%"|15-9
|-
|Win
|4–0
|align=left| Max Dean
|style="font-size:88%"|10-7
|-
|Win
|3–0
|align=left| Matthew Alejandro
|style="font-size:88%"|TF 10-0
|-
! style=background:white colspan=7 | 
|-
|Win
|2–0
|align=left| Nate Jackson
|style="font-size:88%"|TF 13-0
|style="font-size:88%" rowspan=2|January 24–26, 2019
|style="font-size:88%" rowspan=2|2019 Dave Schultz Memorial International
|style="text-align:left;font-size:88%;" rowspan=2|
 Colorado Springs, Colorado
|-
|Win
|1–0
|align=left| Stacey Davis
|style="font-size:88%"|Fall
|-

NCAA record 

! colspan="8"| NCAA Division I Record
|-
!  Res.
!  Record
!  Opponent
!  Score
!  Date
!  Event
|-
! style=background:white colspan=6 | 2022 NCAA Championships  at 184 lbs
|-
|Win
|50–2
|align=left| Myles Amine
|style="font-size:88%"|5-3
|style="font-size:88%" rowspan=5|March 18–20, 2021
|style="font-size:88%" rowspan=5|2022 NCAA Division I National Championships
|-
|Win
|49–2
|align=left| Trent Hidlay
|style="font-size:88%"|6–4(sv)
|-
|Win
|48–2
|align=left| Kaleb Romero
|style="font-size:88%"|13-2
|-
|Win
|47–2
|align=left| Hunter Bolen
|style="font-size:88%"|9-1
|-
|Win
|46–2
|align=left| A.J. Burkhart
|style="font-size:88%"|21-7
|-
! style=background:white colspan=6 |2022 Big Ten Conference  at 184 lbs
|-
|Loss
|45–2
|align=left| Myles Amine
|style="font-size:88%"|4-6 (sv)
|style="font-size:88%" rowspan=3|March 5-6, 2021
|style="font-size:88%" rowspan=3|2022 Big Ten Conference Championships
|-
|Win
|45–1
|align=left| Taylor Venz
|style="font-size:88%"|7-2
|-
|Win
|44–1
|align=left| Kyle Cochran
|style="font-size:88%"|Fall
|-
|Win
|43–1
|align=left| Taylor Venz
|style="font-size:88%"|23-8
|style="font-size:88%"|January 16, 2022
|style="font-size:88%"|Penn State - Nebraska Dual
|-
|Win
|42–1
|align=left| Rocky Jordan
|style="font-size:88%"|Fall
|style="font-size:88%"|February 4, 2022
|style="font-size:88%"|Penn State - Ohio State Dual
|-
|Win
|41–1
|align=left| Abe Assad
|style="font-size:88%"|8-3
|style="font-size:88%"|January 28, 2022
|style="font-size:88%"|Penn State - Iowa Dual
|-
|Win
|40–1
|align=left| Layne Malczewski
|style="font-size:88%"|4-0
|style="font-size:88%"|January 23, 2022
|style="font-size:88%"|Penn State - Michigan State Dual
|-
|Win
|39–1
|align=left| Myles Amine
|style="font-size:88%"|3-1
|style="font-size:88%"|January 21, 2022
|style="font-size:88%"|Penn State - Michigan Dual
|-
|Win
|38–1
|align=left| John Poznanski
|style="font-size:88%"|10-2
|style="font-size:88%"|January 16, 2022
|style="font-size:88%"|Penn State - Rutgers Dual
|-
|Win
|37–1
|align=left| D.J. Washington
|style="font-size:88%"|13-4
|style="font-size:88%"|January 9, 2022
|style="font-size:88%"|Penn State - Indiana Dual
|-
|Win
|36–1
|align=left| Kyle Cochran
|style="font-size:88%"|19-7
|style="font-size:88%"|January 7, 2022
|style="font-size:88%"|Penn State - Maryland Dual
|-
|Win
|35–1
|align=left| Josh Nummer
|style="font-size:88%"|Fall
|style="font-size:88%"|December 21, 2021
|style="font-size:88%"|Penn State - Arizona State Dual
|-
|Win
|34–1
|align=left| Jonathan Loew
|style="font-size:88%"|15-3
|style="font-size:88%"|December 20, 2021
|style="font-size:88%"|Penn State - Cornell Dual
|-
|Win
|33–1
|align=left| Parker Keckeisen
|style="font-size:88%"|3-2
|style="font-size:88%"|December 20, 2021
|style="font-size:88%"|Penn State - Northern Iowa Dual
|-
|Win
|32–1
|align=left| Brad Laughlin
|style="font-size:88%"|21-7
|style="font-size:88%"|November 18, 2021
|style="font-size:88%"|Penn State - Army Dual
|-
|Win
|31–1
|align=left| Jackson McKinney
|style="font-size:88%"|Fall
|style="font-size:88%"|November 13, 2021
|style="font-size:88%"|Penn State - Oregon State Dual
|-
|Win
|30–1
|align=left| Joe Accousti
|style="font-size:88%"|23-8
|style="font-size:88%"|November 13, 2021
|style="font-size:88%"|Penn State - Sacred Heart Dual
|-
|-
! style=background:lighgrey colspan=6 |Start of 2021-2022 Season (Junior year)
|-
! style=background:lighgrey colspan=6 |End of 2020-2021 Season (Sophmore year)
|-
! style=background:white colspan=6 | 2021 NCAA Championships  at 184 lbs
|-
|Win
|29–1
|align=left| Trent Hidlay
|style="font-size:88%"|3–2
|style="font-size:88%" rowspan=5|March 18–20, 2021
|style="font-size:88%" rowspan=5|2021 NCAA Division I National Championships
|-
|Win
|28–1
|align=left| Parker Keckeisen
|style="font-size:88%"|6–4
|-
|Win
|27–1
|align=left| Taylor Venz
|style="font-size:88%"|9–4
|-
|Win
|26–1
|align=left| Owen Webster
|style="font-size:88%"|5–0
|-
|Win
|25–1
|align=left| Jha'quan Anderson
|style="font-size:88%"|TF 17–1
|-
! style=background:white colspan=6 |2021 Big Ten Conference  at 184 lbs
|-
|Win
|24–1
|align=left| Taylor Venz
|style="font-size:88%"|10–5
|style="font-size:88%" rowspan=3|March 6–7, 2021
|style="font-size:88%" rowspan=3|2021 Big Ten Conference Championships
|-
|Win
|23–1
|align=left| John Poznanski
|style="font-size:88%"|MD 10–2
|-
|Win
|22–1
|align=left| Nelson Brands
|style="font-size:88%"|14–8
|-
|Win
|21–1
|align=left| Kyle Cochran
|style="font-size:88%"|MD 18–5
|style="font-size:88%"|February 21, 2021
|style="font-size:88%"|Maryland - Penn State Dual
|-
|Win
|20–1
|align=left| Rocky Jordan
|style="font-size:88%"|MD 13–4
|style="font-size:88%"|February 19, 2021
|style="font-size:88%"|Penn State - Ohio State Dual
|-
|Win
|19–1
|align=left| Jaden Bullock
|style="font-size:88%"|10–5
|style="font-size:88%"|February 14, 2021
|style="font-size:88%"|Penn State - Michigan Dual
|-
|Win
|18–1
|align=left| Chris Weiler
|style="font-size:88%"|MD 12–3
|style="font-size:88%"|February 2, 2021
|style="font-size:88%"|Penn State - Northwestern Dual
|-
|Win
|17–1
|align=left| Jack Jessen
|style="font-size:88%"|TF 21–6
|style="font-size:88%" rowspan=2|January 30, 2021
|style="font-size:88%"|Penn State - Northwestern Dual
|-
|Win
|16–1
|align=left| Drayton Harris
|style="font-size:88%"|MD 18–5
|style="font-size:88%"|American - Penn State Dual
|-
! style=background:lighgrey colspan=6 |Start of 2020-2021 Season (sophomore year)
|-
! style=background:lighgrey colspan=6 |End of 2019-2020 Season (freshman year)
|-
! style=background:white colspan=6 |2020 NCAA's Cancelled (Covid-19) 
|-
! style=background:white colspan=6 |2020 Big Ten Conference  at 184 lbs
|-
|Win
|15–1
|align=left| Cameron Caffey
|style="font-size:88%"|3–2
|style="font-size:88%" rowspan=3|March 7–8, 2020
|style="font-size:88%" rowspan=3|2020 Big Ten Conference Championships
|-
|Win
|14–1
|align=left| Taylor Venz
|style="font-size:88%"|Fall
|-
|Win
|13–1
|align=left| Owen Webster
|style="font-size:88%"|MD 15–4
|-
|Win
|12–1
|align=left| Tanner Harvey
|style="font-size:88%"|8–5
|style="font-size:88%"|February 23, 2020
|style="font-size:88%"|American - Penn State Dual
|-
|Win
|11–1
|align=left| Rocky Jordan
|style="font-size:88%"|MD 15–4
|style="font-size:88%"|February 15, 2020
|style="font-size:88%"|Ohio State - Penn State Dual
|-
|Win
|10–1
|align=left| Owen Webster
|style="font-size:88%"|MD 13–3
|style="font-size:88%"|February 9, 2020
|style="font-size:88%"|Penn State - Minnesota Dual
|-
|Win
|9–1
|align=left| Johnny Sebastian
|style="font-size:88%"|3–2
|style="font-size:88%"|February 7, 2020
|style="font-size:88%"|Penn State - Wisconsin Dual
|-
|Win
|8–1
|align=left| Abe Assad
|style="font-size:88%"|7–3
|style="font-size:88%"|January 31, 2020
|style="font-size:88%"|Penn State - Iowa Dual
|-
|Loss
|7–1
|align=left| Taylor Venz
|style="font-size:88%"|5–9
|style="font-size:88%"|January 24, 2020
|style="font-size:88%"|Penn State - Nebraska Dual
|-
|Win
|7–0
|align=left| Billy Janzer
|style="font-size:88%"|Fall
|style="font-size:88%"|January 19, 2020
|style="font-size:88%"|Rutgers - Penn State Dual
|-
|Win
|6–0
|align=left| Zach Braunagel
|style="font-size:88%"|9–4
|style="font-size:88%"|January 10, 2020
|style="font-size:88%"|Illinois - Penn State Dual
|-
|Win
|5–0
|align=left| Jesse Quatse
|style="font-size:88%"|TF 19–4
|style="font-size:88%"|December 8, 2019
|style="font-size:88%"|Pennsylvania - Penn State Dual
|-
|Win
|4–0
|align=left| Chris Weiller
|style="font-size:88%"|10–5
|style="font-size:88%"|December 6, 2019
|style="font-size:88%"|Penn State - Lehigh Dual
|-
! style=background:white colspan=6 |2019 Mat-Town Open I  at 184 lbs
|-
|Win
|3–0
|align=left| Kyle Myers
|style="font-size:88%"|Fall
|style="font-size:88%" rowspan=3|December 1, 2019
|style="font-size:88%" rowspan=3|2019 Mat-Town Open I
|-
|Win
|2–0
|align=left| Jared McGill
|style="font-size:88%"|11–5
|-
|Win
|1–0
|align=left| Kyle Inlander
|style="font-size:88%"|7–4
|-
! style=background:lighgrey colspan=6 |Start of 2019-2020 Season (freshman year)

Stats 

!  Season
!  Year
!  School
!  Rank
!  Weigh Class
!  Record
!  Win
!  Bonus
|-
|2021
|Sophomore
|rowspan=2|Pennsylvania State University
|#1
|rowspan=2|184
|14–0
|100.00%
|50.00%
|-
|2020
|Freshman
|#3 (Cancelled Covid-19)
|15–1
|93.75%
|43.75%
|-
|colspan=5 bgcolor="LIGHTGREY"|Career
|bgcolor="LIGHTGREY"|29–1
|bgcolor="LIGHTGREY"|96.67%
|bgcolor="LIGHTGREY"|46.66%

Stats 

!  Season
!  Year
!  School
!  Rank
!  Weigh Class
!  Record
!  Win
!  Bonus
|-
|2021
|Sophomore
|rowspan=2|Pennsylvania State University
|#1
|rowspan=2|184
|14–0
|100.00%
|50.00%
|-
|2020
|Freshman
|#3 (DNQ)
|15–1
|93.75%
|43.75%
|-
|colspan=5 bgcolor="LIGHTGREY"|Career
|bgcolor="LIGHTGREY"|29–1
|bgcolor="LIGHTGREY"|96.67%
|bgcolor="LIGHTGREY"|46.66%

Personal life
Brooks is a Christian. He has three brothers and one sister. His older brother Isaiah wrestled alongside him in high school and his two younger brothers are currently active in youth wrestling.

References

External links 
 

African-American sport wrestlers
2000s births
Living people
Year of birth uncertain
American male sport wrestlers
Penn State Nittany Lions wrestlers
Sportspeople from Hagerstown, Maryland
Amateur wrestlers
Pennsylvania State University alumni
21st-century African-American sportspeople